Lithuania participated in the Eurovision Song Contest 2008 with the song "Nomads in the Night" written by Vytautas Diškevičius and Jeronimas Milius. The song was performed by Jeronimas Milius. The Lithuanian broadcaster Lithuanian National Radio and Television (LRT) organised the national final "Eurovizijos" dainų konkurso nacionalinė atranka (Eurovision Song Contest national selection) in order to select the Lithuanian entry for the 2008 contest in Belgrade, Serbia. The national final took place over four weeks and involved 34 competing entries. Entries that advanced in the competition were determined by the combination of votes from a jury panel and a public vote. In the final, fourteen entries remained and a public vote entirely selected "Nomads in the Night" performed by Jeronimas Milius as the winner with 11,674 votes.

Lithuania was drawn to compete in the second semi-final of the Eurovision Song Contest which took place on 22 May 2008. Performing during the show in position 5, "Nomads in the Night" was not announced among the 10 qualifying entries of the second semi-final and therefore did not qualify to compete in the final. It was later revealed that Lithuania placed sixteenth out of the 19 participating countries in the semi-final with 30 points.

Background 

Prior to the 2008 contest, Lithuania had participated in the Eurovision Song Contest eight times since its first entry in 1994. The nation’s best placing in the contest was sixth, which it achieved in 2006 with the song "We Are the Winners" performed by LT United. Following the introduction of semi-finals in 2004, Lithuania, to this point, has managed to qualify to the final two times. In the 2007 contest, "Love or Leave" performed by 4Fun automatically qualified to the final where the song scored 28 points and placed 21th.

For the 2008 contest, the Lithuanian national broadcaster, Lithuanian National Radio and Television (LRT), broadcast the event within Lithuania and organised the selection process for the nation's entry. Other than the internal selection of their debut entry in 1994, Lithuania has selected their entry consistently through a national final procedure. LRT confirmed their intentions to participate at the 2008 Eurovision Song Contest on 29 October 2007 and announced the organization of "Eurovizijos" dainų konkurso nacionalinė atranka, which would be the national final to select Lithuania's entry for Belgrade.

Before Eurovision

"Eurovizijos" dainų konkurso nacionalinė atranka 
"Eurovizijos" dainų konkurso nacionalinė atranka (Eurovision Song Contest national selection) was the national final format developed by LRT in order to select Lithuania's entry for the Eurovision Song Contest 2008. The competition involved a four-week-long process that commenced on 12 January 2008 and concluded with a winning song and artist on 2 February 2008. The four shows took place at the LRT studios in Vilnius and were broadcast on LTV, LTV World and Lietuvos Radijas as well as online via the broadcaster's website lrt.lt.

Format 
The Lithuanian broadcaster downsized the format of the national final from that of previous years. The 2008 competition involved 34 entries and consisted of four shows. 32 of the entries participated in the first three shows which were the semi-finals. Each semi-final consisted of ten or twelve entries each and the top four proceeded to the final. The results of the semi-finals were determined by the 50/50 combination of votes from a three-member jury panel and public televoting. Each jury member had an equal stake in the final result and the public televote had a weighting equal to the votes of three jury members. Ties were decided in favour of the entry that received the most votes from the public. An additional two artists that entered the competition were established with prior Eurovision experience, having participated in the Lithuanian national final in previous years, and therefore their entries competed directly in the final. In the final, the winner was selected from the remaining fourteen entries solely by public televoting. The public could vote through telephone and SMS voting.

Competing entries 
LRT opened a submission period on 29 October 2007 for artists and songwriters to submit their entries with the deadline on 10 December 2007. On 4 January 2008, LRT announced the 36 entries selected for the competition from 73 submissions received. Two of the selected entries were entered by established artists and automatically advanced to the final: "Troy on Fire" performed by Aistė Pilvelytė and "To My Soul" performed by Julija and Girma. Julija represented Lithuania at Eurovision in 2007 as part of 4Fun. The final changes to the list of 36 competing acts were later made with withdrawal of the song "Let's Sing It" performed by Vudis and Grūdas on 16 January 2008 and the disqualification of the song "Final Shot" performed by Suicide DJ's on 23 February 2008 due to it being publicly performed before 1 October 2007.

Shows

Semi-finals 
The three semi-finals of the competition aired on 12, 19 and 26 January 2008 and featured the 32 competing entries. The semi-finals were hosted by Rolandas Vilkončius. The members of the jury in the first semi-final consisted of Darius Užkuraitis (Opus 3 director), Neda Malunavičiūtė (singer) and Robertas Aleksaitis (actor), while the jury in the second semi-final consisted of Vytautas Juozapaitis (opera singer), Aras Vėberis (producer) and Jurijus Smoriginas (choreographer), and the jury in the third semi-final consisted of Alanas Chošnau (singer-songwriter), Rosita Čivilytė (singer) and Zita Kelmickaitė (musicologist). The top four entries advanced to the final from each semi-final, while the bottom entries were eliminated.

Final
The final of the competition took place on 2 February 2008 and was hosted by Giedrius Masalskis and Gabrielė Bartkutė. The show featured the remaining twelve entries that qualified from the three semi-finals alongside the two automatic qualifiers and "Nomads in the Night" performed by Jeronimas Milius was selected as the winner after gaining the most votes from the public. In addition to the performances of the competing entries, Ruslan Alekhno performed the 2008 Belarusian Eurovision entry "Hasta la vista" as the interval act.

Promotion 
Jeronimas Milius specifically promoted "Nomads in the Night" as the Lithuanian Eurovision entry on 1 March 2008 by performing the song during the final of the Latvian Eurovision national final Eirodziesma 2008.

At Eurovision
It was announced in September 2007 that the competition's format would be expanded to two semi-finals in 2008. According to Eurovision rules, all nations with the exceptions of the host country and the "Big Four" (France, Germany, Spain and the United Kingdom) are required to qualify from one of two semi-finals in order to compete for the final; the top nine songs from each semi-final as determined by televoting progress to the final, and a tenth was determined by back-up juries. The European Broadcasting Union (EBU) split up the competing countries into six different pots based on voting patterns from previous contests, with countries with favourable voting histories put into the same pot. On 28 January 2008, a special allocation draw was held which placed each country into one of the two semi-finals. Lithuania was placed into the second semi-final, to be held on 22 May 2008. The running order for the semi-finals was decided through another draw on 17 March 2008 and Lithuania was set to perform in position 5, following the entry from Ukraine and before the entry from Albania.

The two semi-finals and final were broadcast in Lithuania on LTV and LTV World with commentary by Darius Užkuraitis. The Lithuanian spokesperson, who announced the Lithuanian votes during the final, was Rolandas Vilkončius.

Semi-final 

Jeronimas Milius took part in technical rehearsals on 14 and 18 May, followed by dress rehearsals on 21 and 22 May. The Lithuanian performance featured Jeronimas Milius performing on stage alone with dark blue stage colours and the LED screens displaying a shining moon. The performance also featured smoke effects. At the end of the show, Lithuania was not announced among the top 10 entries in the second semi-final and therefore failed to qualify to compete in the final. It was later revealed that Lithuania placed sixteenth in the semi-final, receiving a total of 30 points.

Voting 
Below is a breakdown of points awarded to Lithuania and awarded by Lithuania in the semi-final and grand final of the contest. The nation awarded its 12 points to Latvia in the semi-final and to Russia in the final of the contest.

Points awarded to Lithuania

Points awarded by Lithuania

References

2008
Countries in the Eurovision Song Contest 2008
Eurovision